Lepidochrysops swartbergensis, the Swartberg blue, is a butterfly of the family Lycaenidae. It is found in South Africa, where it found in fynbos on the Swartberg range from the Eastern Cape to Seweweekspoort and Klein Swartberg in the Western Cape. It is also found on the Rooiberg.

The wingspan is 32–36 mm for males and 34–38 mm for females. Adults are on wing from November to February. There is one extended generation per year.

References

Butterflies described in 1969
Lepidochrysops
Endemic butterflies of South Africa